New Tales to Tell: A Tribute to Love and Rockets is a tribute album to Love and Rockets, released on June 28, 2009 by record labels Arsenal Rock n Roll and Justice.

Track listing

References

External links 

 

2009 compilation albums
Tribute albums